V. Arumugam may refer to:

 V. Arumugam (Indian politician)
 V. Arumugam (Malaysian politician)